The Azopardo-class frigates were a class of two post-World War II warships, designed and built in Argentina in 1940-1959, originally as part of a class of four large minelayers (see Murature-class ships). They were in service with the Argentine Navy from the mid-1950s to 1972. The class was named after Juan Bautista Azopardo, an Argentine naval officer in the Independence and Cisplatine wars.

Design 

The class was as part of a program to build four mine warfare ships during the Second World War, of which two (Murature and King) were completed as patrol ships in the 1940s and the others (Piedrabuena and Azopardo) as antisubmarine frigates in the 1950s.

The Azopardo class frigates had a metal hull with a single mast and funnel. They were powered by two Parsons steam turbines fed by two water-tube boilers, driving two propellers.

The main battery was composed of four  Bofors DP guns, with a secondary battery of four  Bofors Anti-Aircraft guns in single mountings. It also carried four anti-submarine mortars.

Service history 
The Azopardo class was designed in the early 1940s; however due to shortages during World War II the ships were laid down in the early 1950s and completed in 1956-58. They were commissioned by the Argentine Navy in 1956-59 and remained in service until the early 1970s.

Azopardo and Piedra Buena were incorporated in the High Seas Fleet ( Flota de Mar), and frequently used to patrol the Argentine Sea and in training exercises, including the multinational “UNITAS”.

Both ships were sold for scrap after being decommissioned in 1972, and were broken up in the 1970s..

Ships in class

See also 
 List of ships of the Argentine Navy
 Murature-class patrol ship

Footnotes

References

Notes

Bibliography

Further reading

External links 

 Frigate ARA “Azopardo” - Histarmar website (Historia y Arqueología Marítima – Fragata "Azopardo" P-35) (accessed 2016-12-25)
 Frigate ARA “Piedra Buena” - Histarmar website (Historia y Arqueología Marítima – Fragata "Piedra Buena" P-36) (accessed 2016-12-25)

 
Frigates of Argentina
Ships built in Argentina
Frigate classes